Arsenic Lake is a lake in the Ottawa River drainage basin in Strathy Township of Temagami, Nipissing District in Northeastern Ontario, Canada, located between the town of Temagami and Temagami North near Highway 11. It is the only officially named Arsenic Lake in Canada.

The primary outflow is an unnamed creek to Net Lake, which flows via Cassels Lake, Rabbit Lake, the Matabitchuan River and Lake Timiskaming into the Ottawa River.

See also
Lakes of Temagami

Notes

References

Strathy Township
Lakes of Temagami